Alegría is a Mexican candy made from seeds of amaranth and honey or sugar that is produced mainly in the town of Santiago Tulyehualco in the Xochimilco borough of Mexico City. It has been known as alegría, Spanish for "joy," since the 16th century. The alegría of Tulyehualco was officially declared Patrimonio Cultural Intangible de la Ciudad de México (an intangible part of the cultural heritage of Mexico City) in September 2016.

Amaranth is a plant native to Mexico. In prehispanic times, in addition to forming part of the diet of the indigenous people, it was also used as currency and for ceremonial purposes. Figures of amaranth and honey were made as offerings to the gods. In order to stop those religious practices, Hernán Cortés banned the cultivation of amaranth. The plant began to fall into disuse because those who continued to cultivate it faced being put to death as punishment.

Alegrías have become the most popular way of consuming amaranth. These sweets are prepared by puffing the seeds in a hot pan without oil. The popping starts in seconds. When finished, they are mixed with honey or sugar syrup and sometimes with additions such as roasted seeds (e.g. peanut or pumpkin) or chopped dried fruits. The mixture is molded into different forms and is packaged for sale.

References

External links

Confectionery
Mexican desserts